The bat ray (Myliobatis californica) is an eagle ray found in muddy or sandy sloughs, estuaries and bays, kelp beds and rocky-bottomed shoreline in the eastern Pacific Ocean, between the Oregon coast and the Gulf of California. It is also found in the area around the Galápagos Islands. The size of the bat ray is dependent on many factors, such as habitat alterations, different oceanographic and environmental conditions. Bat rays have one to three venomous barbed spines at the base of its tail. Some bat rays are solitary while others form schools numbering in the thousands. 

The sexual maturity size of the female Myliobatis california is often greater than the male one. Bat rays are euryhaline, i.e. they are able to live in environments with a wide range of salinities. Predators of the bat ray include California sea lion, great white sharks and broadnose sevengill sharks. To keep themselves safe from predators, bat rays camoflauge in the sand.

Diet
Bat rays feed on mollusks, crustaceans and small fish on the seabed, using their winglike pectoral fins to move sand and expose prey animals. They may also use their snout to dig trenches up to 20 cm deep to expose buried prey, such as clams. Bat ray teeth are flat and pavementlike, forming tightly-packed rows that are used for crushing and grinding prey—the crushed shells are ejected and the flesh consumed. As with all elasmobranchs, these teeth fall out and are replaced continuously.

Relationship with humans
While the bat ray, like other stingrays, has a venomous spine in its tail (near the base), it is not considered dangerous and uses the spine only when attacked or frightened. Humans can avoid these spines by shuffling their feet when traversing shallow sand.

Currently, the bat ray is fished commercially in Mexico but not the United States. Prehistorically, native tribes on the California coast (probably Ohlone), especially in the San Francisco Bay area, fished bat rays in large numbers, presumably for food.

Commercial growers have long believed bat rays (which inhabit the same estuarine areas favored for the industry) prey on oysters and trapped them in large numbers. In fact, crabs (which are prey of bat rays) are principally responsible for oyster loss. Bat rays are not considered endangered or threatened.

Bat rays are popular in marine parks, and visitors are often allowed to touch or stroke the ray, usually on the wing.

Relationship with other animals 
The holes that bat rays leave behind after digging with their snouts allow smaller fish to eat the organisms hidden in the sand that they otherwise would not be able to retrieve themselves. These holes can be as large as 4 meters long and 20 centimeters deep.

Life cycle
Bat ray reproduction is ovoviviparous. They mate annually, in the spring or summer, and have a gestation period of nine to twelve months. Litter sizes range from two to ten — pups emerge tail first with their pectoral fins wrapped around the body, and the venomous spine is flexible and covered in a sheath which sloughs off within hours of birth. Bat rays live up to 23 years.

Bat rays copulate while swimming with synchronized wingbeats—the male under the female. The male inserts a clasper into the female's cloaca, channeling semen into the orifice to fertilize her eggs.

Gallery

References

External links
 

Myliobatis
Ovoviviparous fish
Western North American coastal fauna
Fauna of California
Fish of the Gulf of California
Fish of the Western United States
Galápagos Islands coastal fauna
Fish described in 1865